Magdalena Solari Quintana (born 23 January 1968) is an Argentine politician, currently serving as a National Senator for Misiones Province since 2017. She previously served as a member of the Posadas City Council. She is a member of the Party of Social Concord.

Solari Quintana was born in Buenos Aires. She studied law at the Catholic University of Santa Fe, graduating in 2001. She was a member of the Posadas City Council until her election to the Senate, and was twice elected to preside the body, from 2013 to 2015.

Solari Quintana was the second Front for the Renewal of Concord (FRC) candidate to the National Senate in Misiones for the 2017 legislative election, behind Maurice Closs. The FRC was the most voted list in the province, and Solari Quintana was elected. She was sworn in on 29 November 2017. In the Senate, she is part of the parliamentary commissions on Women's Affairs, Education and Culture, Justice and Criminal Affairs, General Legislation, Tourism and Accords.

As of 2021, she presides the single-member FRC bloc in the Senate, as Closs joined the Frente de Todos bloc in 2019.

References

External links
Profile on the official website of the Senate (in Spanish)

1968 births
Living people
Politicians from Buenos Aires
People from Posadas, Misiones
Members of the Argentine Senate for Misiones
Women members of the Argentine Senate
21st-century Argentine women politicians
21st-century Argentine politicians